Male and Female is a 1919 American silent adventure/drama film directed by Cecil B. DeMille and starring Gloria Swanson and Thomas Meighan. Its main themes are gender relations and social class. The film is based on the 1902 J. M. Barrie play The Admirable Crichton.

A previous version was filmed the year before in England as The Admirable Crichton.

Plot
The film centers on the relationship between Lady Mary Loam (Swanson), a British aristocrat, and her butler, Crichton (Meighan). Crichton fancies a romance with Mary, but she disdains him because of his lower social class. When the two and some others are shipwrecked on a deserted island, they are left to fend for themselves in a state of nature.

The aristocrats' abilities to survive are far worse than those of Crichton, and a role reversal ensues, with the butler becoming a king among the stranded group. Crichton and Mary are about to wed on the island when the group is rescued. Upon returning to Britain, Crichton chooses not to marry Mary; instead, he asks a maid, Tweeny (who was attracted to Crichton throughout the film), to marry him, and the two move to the United States.

Production
The film contains two famous scenes, indicative of de Mille's predilections as a filmmaker. 
An early scene depicts Gloria Swanson bathing in an elaborate setting, attended by two maids, lavishing her with rosewater and bath salts, silk dressing gown, and luxurious towels. 
Toward the end of the film, a fantasy sequence about ancient Babylon shows Swanson posed as Gabriel von Max's famous painting The Lion's Bride, which involved her being photographed with an actual lion.

Cast
 Lila Lee as Tweeny, the scullery maid
 Theodore Roberts as Lord Loam
 Raymond Hatton as Honorable Ernest 'Ernie' Wolley
 Mildred Reardon as Lady Agatha 'Aggie' Lasenby
 Gloria Swanson as Lady Mary Lasenby
 Thomas Meighan as Crichton, the butler
 Robert Cain as Lord Brockelhurst
 Bebe Daniels as King's Favorite
 Julia Faye as Susan, 2nd Maid
 Rhy Darby as Lady Eileen Duncraigie
 Edmund Burns as Treherne
 Henry Woodward as McGuire, Lady Eileen's Chauffeur
 Sydney Deane as Thomas
 Wesley Barry as Buttons, the Boy
 Slats the Lion

Accolades
The film was nominated for the American Film Institute's 2002 list AFI's 100 Years...100 Passions.

DVD release
Male and Female was released on Region 0 DVD-R by Alpha Video on January 28, 2014.

See also
List of American films of 1919
The House That Shadows Built (1931 promotional film by Paramount)

References

External links

Male and Female available for free download at Internet Archive

1919 films
1910s adventure drama films
American adventure drama films
American silent feature films
American black-and-white films
Famous Players-Lasky films
American films based on plays
Films based on works by J. M. Barrie
Films directed by Cecil B. DeMille
Films about survivors of seafaring accidents or incidents
Films set in London
Films set on uninhabited islands
Paramount Pictures films
Surviving American silent films
Articles containing video clips
1919 drama films
1910s English-language films
1910s American films
Silent American drama films
Silent adventure drama films